Wabamun 133B is a First Nations reserve in central Alberta, Canada, in Division No. 11. It is located adjacent to Parkland County near the east shore of Lake Wabamun and is part of the Paul First Nation. The Summer Village of Kapasiwin and the Wabamun 133A Indian reserve are adjacent to Wabamun 133B to the west and south respectively.

Demographics 
In 2006, Wabamun 133B had a population of 20 people living in 5 dwellings.

See also 
List of communities in Alberta
List of Indian reserves in Alberta

References 

Edmonton Metropolitan Region
Indian reserves in Alberta